Daoud Mustafa Khalid (10 August 1917 – 3 June 2008) was a prominent Sudanese physician and neurologist. He was known as the "founding father of medicine in Sudan''.

Early life 
Daoud was born in Tuti Island, on 10 August 1917.

Career 
Khalid studied medicine at Kitchener School of Medicine in 1936. His outstanding educational career included prizes of anatomy, physiology pathology, medicine, and surgery.

From 1943 to 1949, Khalid worked in several hospitals across Sudan, including Meroë, Wad Medani, and Omdurman Teaching Hospital. He was well known for his responsibility towards all his patients without any discrimination. He was universally accepted as a leader, and was honored and well respected physician.

In 1950, Khalid got a scholarship and moved to the UK to study internal medicine. In 1952, he was among the few Sudanese physicians at that time to obtain a Membership of the Royal Colleges of Physicians. Khalid returned to Sudan in 1952, and worked as physician at Atbara Hospital for one year. He then returned to Omdurman Teaching Hospital, and also worked as a part-time lecturer in department of medicine at University College Khartoum.

In 1960, Khalid moved to the UK again for 1 year for further medical training. In 1963, he became the first Sudanese head of department of medicine at University of Khartoum. In 1965, he was promoted to professor of medicine. In 1967, with Professor Hussin Suliman Abusalih, Khalid cofounded the Sudanese Society of Neurosciences (SSNS). In 1974, he became the dean of Faculty of Medicine, University of Khartoum, and one year later, was awarded the title of professor emeritus. It's well known that he established neurology as a specialty in Sudan.

Awards 

 Prizes of anatomy, physiology pathology, medicine, and surgery at Kitchener School of Medicine (1936 - 1941).
 Honorary Doctorate in Sciences by University of Khartoum (1988).
 El Gomhoria medal (1978).
 El Nilein medal (1989).
 El Injaz Star medal (1990).
 “Martyr Elzubeir Mohamed Salih Prize” for distinguished and excellent scientific achievements (2001).
 Medal of Sciences and Arts, First Class Arabic Republic of Egypt (1983).
 Honorary Doctorate in Sciences by University of al-Jazirah (1998).

Eponymous 

 Daoud Mustafa Hall (Faculty of Medicine, University of Khartoum).
 Daoud Research Group (founded by professor Abbashar Hussein).
Daoud Mustafa Hall (Tuti Island's Family Health Medical Center).
Daoud Mustafa Khalid Ward (Omdurman Teaching Hospital).

Death 
Daoud died on 3 June 2008 at his home.

References 

University of Khartoum alumni
Sudanese neurologists
20th-century physicians

1917 births
2008 deaths
Recipients of orders, decorations, and medals of Sudan